TVP 2 (TVP Dwa, Program II Telewizji Polskiej, "Dwójka") is a Polish public mainstream TV channel operated by TVP. Launched in October 1970, its varied line-up contains a variety of programming (documentary, history, talk-shows, game-shows) although it focuses on entertainment: stand up comedy, comic shows, cabaret, and themed talk shows (for example on travel or foreign cultures).

History
On October 2, 1970, when the second program of Telewizja Polska was broadcast, the chairman of the Radio Committee, Włodzimierz Sokorski, announced during a ceremonial speech that the launch of the new program was an expression of "concern for the nation's education and culture". The channel was initially an educational network that broadcast mainly science and education programs, including language learning; that is why "Dwójka" also broadcast foreign films in the original version in slots such as Kino wersji oryginalnej (Movies in their original version) or the slightly later Kino poliglotów (Films for Polyglots). It was intended to promote the achievements of theater, film and good entertainment.

The network also broadcast program blocks devoted to the countries of "people's democracy", such as Czechoslovakia Day on TP, Yugoslavia Day on TVP, where documentaries and fictional films as well as entertainment programs from these countries were broadcast, but some Western countries were also presented (such as French Day on TVP, Austrian Day on TVP).

After the final abolition of martial law in 1983 and the return to regular broadcasting, the concept of the network began to be implemented as a channel with its own, clearer face, which could significantly diversify the programming offer. At the beginning, the focus was mainly on documentary series about outstanding artists, in particular about writers (the Great Writers series), travel series and series devoted to the masterpieces of cinematography, both included in author's series (such as films by Woody Allen, Ingmar Bergman) and in series thematic (such as Latin American Cinema).

When Zbigniew Napierała became the director of the network, more classical music programs appeared on the air, which then took up as much as 11% of airtime. The channel gained a new "face" when Józef Węgrzyn became the director, who decided to introduce more entertainment and journalistic programs (his idea was, among others, Panorama dnia), an original announcer studio and a completely new team of announcers - presenters. At that time, they made their debut in Dwójka, among others Iwona Kubicz, Jolanta Fajkowska or Grażyna Torbicka. More and more interesting programs were broadcast, and the films were always presented in such a way that their broadcasting time did not coincide with the films on TP1.

Nowadays, TVP2 is a television channel with a very diverse line-up, however, despite the programming diversity, in recent years, the network was dominated by entertainment, but the line-up also includes various cultural programs.

TVP 2 HD

In addition to its SD broadcast, a HD version of TVP 2 is also
broadcast. Broadcast of TVP 2 HD began in June 2012 with the coverage of the UEFA Euro 2012.

SD broadcasting via satellite (Eutelsat Hot Bird) stopped on 7 April 2017.

TVP2 Regio is on HD.

Current line-up

News shows
 Panorama (at 6 pm)

Reporters/talk show
 Magazyn Ekspres Reporterów (Reporters Express Magazine)- reporter magazine, hosted by Michał Olszański

Polish series

Foreign series
 House M.D. - in Polish "Dr House"
 Modern Family - in Polish "Współczesna rodzina"
 CSI: Crime Scene Investigation - in Polish "CSI: Kryminalne Zagadki Las Vegas"
 Kurt Seyit ve Şura - in Polish "Imperium miłości"
 Scandal - in Polish "Skandal"
 Grimm
 Lie to Me - in Polish "Magia kłamstwa"
 Dirt - in Polish "Intrygi i kłamstwa"
 Life - in Polish "Powrót do Życia"
 In Plain Sight - in Polish "Na linii strzału"
 Castle
 Ugly Betty - in Polish "Brzydula Betty"
 My Name Is Earl - in Polish "Na imię mi Earl"
 Battlestar Galactica
 The Closer - in Polish "Podkomisarz Brenda Johnson"
 Knights of Prosperity - in Polish "Obrobić VIP-a"
 Twin Peaks - in Polish "Miasteczko Twin Peaks"
 M.A.S.H.
 Yasak Elma
 Bionic Woman - in Polish "Bionic Woman: Agentka Przyszłości"
 Junior Eurovision Song Contest 2017 - in Polish "Konkurs Piosenki Eurowizji dla Dzieci 2017"

Entertainment
 The Voice of Poland 
 The Voice Kids
 Pink Lady and Jeff (1982-1986, Polish dub, as "Pink Lady i Jeff")
 The Voice Senior
 Kocham Cię, Polsko! (I Love My Country)
 Bake Off - Ale ciacho!
 Kochanie, ratujmy nasze dzieci
 Pierwsza randka (First Dates)
 Familiada (Family Feud) 
 Koło Fortuny (Wheel of Fortune)
 Postaw na milion (The Million Pound Drop Live)
 Va banque (Jeopardy!)

Sports
 UEFA Europa League (Final and Polish teams)
 2022 FIFA World Cup
 UEFA Euro 2021
 IAAF World Championships in Athletics
 European Athletics Championships

Morning show
 Pytanie na śniadanie (A question for breakfast)

Documentary series/Lifestyle programs
 Sonda 2 - popular science series, hosted by Tomasz Rożek
 Wojciech Cejrowski - boso przez świat (Wojciech Cejrowski - Barefoot Around the World) - travel series
 Makłowicz w podróźy (Makłowicz traveling) - travel and culinary series
 Podróże z historią - history documentary series, hosted by Radosław Kotarski

Culture
 Kultura, głupcze (Culture, stupid) - cultural talk show hosted by Kamil Dąbrowa
 Kocham Kino (I love movies) - movie magazine hosted by Grażyna Torbicka
 WOK - Wszystko o Kulturze (Everything about the culture)
 Rozmowy po-szczególne

Primetime schedule
All times are CET.

Early fringe schedule
All times are CET.

NOTE:  As of December 2020, Jeopardy! airs at 6:20 and not 6:30 PM.  Panorama is shortened for that reason.

Previously on TVP 2

Polish series
 Złotopolscy (The Złotopolskis)
 Egzamin z życia (Life Exam)
 Kopciuszek (Cinderella)
 Licencja na wychowanie (License for education)
 Apetyt na życie (Apettite for life)
 U Pana Boga w ogródku (In the garden of God)
 Ja to mam szczęście (I am lucky enough to)
 Głęboka woda (Deep water) - drama series (spring 2011, 1 season)
 Czas honoru (Time of honor) - war drama series (autumn 2008–2014, 6 seasons)

Foreign series
 Seks w wielkim mieście - Sex and the City
 Z Archiwum X - The X-Files
 Rzym - Rome
 Mała Brytania - Little Britain
 Dr Quinn - Dr. Quinn, Medicine Woman
 Kochanie, zmniejszyłem dzieciaki - Honey, I Shrunk the Kids: The TV Show
 Nie ma to jak Hotel - The Suite Life of Zack & Cody
 Powrót na October Road - October Road

Comedy series
 Aida
 Wiadomości z drugiej ręki (News on the other hand)
 Codzienna 2 m. 3 (Everyday Lane 2/3)
 Lokatorzy (Lodgers)
 Święta wojna (Holy War)

Entertainment
 Duże dzieci (a programme in which young children discuss various topics: from politics to cuisine)
 Europa da się lubić (Europe's easy to like)
 Fabryka śmiechu (Laughter factory)
 Mój pierwszy raz (My first time)
 Od przedszkola do Opola (a programme in which young children sing with professionals)
 Oto jest pytanie
 Gilotyna (Cresus)
 Podróże z żartem (Travel with laughter) -  a travel talk show
 30 ton - lista, lista, lista przebojów - top 30 chart show
 Bezludna wyspa (talk show)
 Dubidu (music show)
 Spotkanie z balladą
 Tele PRLe
 Tygodnik Moralnego Niepokoju (TV show of Polish cabaret Kabaret Moralnego Niepokoju)
 Fort Boyard
 Szansa na sukces (Chance for success)
 Wideoteka dorosłego człowieka (Human Adult Video Library) - programme about music from 1950s, 1960s, 1970s and 1980s
 Tak to leciało! (Don't Forget the Lyrics!)
 Bitwa na głosy (Clash of the Choirs)
 Kabaretowy Klub Dwójki (Twos Comedy Club) - performances of the best Polish cabarets
 Kocham to, co lubię (I love what I like) - satirical and cultural talk show hosted by Wojciech Mann
 Dzięki Bogu już weekend (Thank God It's Weekend) - Polish cabarets
 SuperSTARcie (Polish version of Ultimate Entertainer)
 Latający Klub Dwójki (The Two's Flying Club) - Polish cabarets
 Paranienormalni Tonight - comedy talk show
 Jeden z dziesięciu (Fifteen to One)
 Wielka Gra (The $64,000 Question)

Documentary/talk shows
 Tomasz Lis na żywo (2008-2016)
 Kochaj mnie
 Warto rozmawiać - controversial talk show, accused of right-wing spinning (since March 2016 on TVP1)
 Magazyn Kryminalny 997

Children's shows
 Ulica Sezamkowa (Polish Sesame Street)

Anime
 Peter Pan: The Animated Series (as Piotruś Pan)
 Princess Sara (as Mała Księżniczka)

Logos and identities

See also
 Television in Poland
 Television in Poland#Terrestrial
 Eastern Bloc information dissemination

References

External links

 Official Site 

Eastern Bloc mass media
Telewizja Polska
Television channels and stations established in 1970
Television channels in Poland
1970 establishments in Poland